Gabriela Rocha may refer to:

 Gabriela Rocha (singer) (born 1994), Brazilian Christian singer and songwriter
 Gabriela Rocha (swimmer) (born 1995), Brazilian swimmer